The Man, the King, the Girl is Deerhoof's first album.  It was released on Kill Rock Stars.

Track listing
"Tiger Chain"
"Polly Bee"
"Sophie"
"A-Town Test Site"
"Gold on Black"
"For Those of Us on Foot"
"Gore in Rut"
"Wheely Freed Speaks to the People"
"Bendidin"
"Itchy P-Pads"
"The Pickup Bear"
"The Comedian Flavorists"
"Queen of the Mole People"
"Kneil" (live)
"Gore in Crown" (live)
"Carriage" (live)
"The Mausker" (live)
"Gold on Black" (live)

Personnel

 Rob Fisk – guitar
 Satomi Matsuzaki – vocals
 Greg Saunier – drums

References

Deerhoof albums
1997 debut albums
Kill Rock Stars albums